Chkonia or Chqonia is a Georgian surname. Notable people with the surname include:

Lamara Chkonia (born 1930), Georgian singer
Temur Chkonia (in Georgian), CEO of Coca-Cola bottlers Georgia

Georgian-language surnames